Scalawag is a 1973 film directed by Kirk Douglas, his first of two films directed, the other being Posse. The film is a western re-telling of Treasure Island by Robert Louis Stevenson.

Plot

Cast

Production
The film was based on an original story by Albert Maltz. It was announced in 1966 and was going to be a co production between Kirk Douglas' Joel Production and Malcolm Stuart's Coldwater Productions. Douglas would star. It would be the first time Maltz would receive screen credit in  19 years.

Filming was delayed. Douglas formed his own company to make it and raised the money. He hired his wife as producer, his son as stills photographer and another son as office boy. "So if this film stinks we've got the whole Douglas family to blame," said Douglas. He added, "My phone doesn't ring any more. I have to find my own work."

In 1972 Douglas said he would produce and direct it as well as star and that the script was by Sid Fleischman. Filming was to start in Yugoslavia in June 1972. By May the cast included Mark Lester, Lesley Anne Down and Danny DeVito. Douglas said he rewrote the screenplay.

"I wanted to get back the old feeling of movies I experienced as a kid," said Douglas, "pirates, derring-do, people getting killed, but you don't see any blood."

"It's a version of Treasure Island set in the old West on horseback," said Douglas. "There's adventure, violence, and there's romance - a girl sings a romantic song while dreaming of a good looking guy. Yes it's old fashioned but that's what I liked as a kid. I guess I haven't lost either my love of romance or my sense of innocence."

Douglas said, "There was no pretentiousness about" the shoot. "We lived under primitive conditions with no toilets and learned one Yugoslavian phrase to save our lives - 'Bex bela luka'. That means 'no garlic'. You see old movies on the Late Show and everybody asks why they don't make movies like that anymore. Critics have made it fashionable to be pretentious and incoherent."

References

External links
 
 
 
 
 

1973 films
1970s adventure films
British adventure films
Bryna Productions films
Films directed by Kirk Douglas
Films scored by John Cameron
Films set in the 1840s
Paramount Pictures films
Treasure Island films
1973 directorial debut films
1970s English-language films
1970s British films